Dinbandhu Shrestha is a Nepali politician of Nepali Congress and Minister for Water Resoource and Energy in Karnali government since 5 June 2021. He is also serving as member of the Karnali Province Provincial Assembly. Shrestha was elected to the 2017 provincial assembly elections from proportional list of the party. He including one other ministers from Nepali Congress saved incumbent cabinet in vote of confidence. He joined Mahendra Bahadur Shahi cabinet on 5 June 2021 after a group of CPN(UML) withdrew support from the government. As a result of talks between the two parties Coongress Joined the government with two ministries.

References 

Living people
Nepali Congress politicians from Karnali Province
Year of birth missing (living people)
Provincial cabinet ministers of Nepal
Members of the Provincial Assembly of Karnali Province